Allison Linnell (born May 2, 1990) is an American professional racing cyclist living in Miami, FL, who rides for Hagens Berman–Supermint since 2015. Prior to cycling she was a runner at the University of Washington and an Ironman triathlete. She competed at the Ironman World Championships in Kona, HI in 2012 and 2013.

See also
 List of 2016 UCI Women's Teams and riders

References

External links
 
 

1990 births
Living people
American female cyclists
Place of birth missing (living people)
21st-century American women